Mark Hugh James (born 28 October 1953) is an English professional golfer who had a long career on the European Tour and captained Europe in the 1999 Ryder Cup. He has also played senior golf on the European Senior Tour and the U.S.-based Champions Tour.

Early life and amateur career
James was born in Manchester, England and educated at Stamford School.  He won the English Amateur championship at Woodhall Spa in 1974  and was a member of the Great Britain & Ireland 1975 Walker Cup team.

Professional career

European Tour
His first professional win was the 1977 Lusaka Open and the following year he picked up the first of his eighteen wins on the European Tour at the Sun Alliance Match Play Championship. He also holds the record for the highest European Tour event 18-hole-round of 111 strokes at the 1978 Italian Open in Sardinia, when refusing to with-draw despite an injury. Four years later he won the same tournament.

James never won a major championship, but he had four top-five finishes at The Open Championship. He was consistently competitive on the European Tour winning 12 times with 20 top-30 finishes on the Order of Merit, including seven top-10 finishes, the best of them third place in 1979. He was diagnosed with testicular cancer in 2000, but after treatment began playing golf again in 2001.

Ryder Cup
James represented Great Britain & Ireland or Europe in the Ryder Cup seven times including 1989 when Europe tied the match and retained the cup they had won in 1987, and 1995 when they won it outright. He was the European captain in the controversial "Battle of Brookline" in 1999, when the behaviour of the American galleries and team created a great deal of resentment in Europe, and also James' own actions during the matches drew fire from both sides of the Atlantic.

Prior to the event, James controversially chose Andrew Coltart as his second captain's pick on the team, thus leaving out Nick Faldo and Bernhard Langer (veterans who were the two most successful players for the European team in Ryder Cup history). In one of the most discussed moves in the Ryder Cup, James then kept Jean van de Velde, Jarmo Sandelin and Coltart on the bench during all sixteen matches during the first two days of play, relegating them to singles matches on Sunday only. His refusal to play those three first-time players helped lead to Europe's defeat, as none of the three won their one match. On the other hand, United States captain Ben Crenshaw played all twelve players at least once during the first two days, even though Mark O'Meara only played once.

James published a best selling book about the event called Into the Bear Pit in 2000. In addition to criticising the behaviour of the Americans at Brookline, it also detailed James' clashes with some of his fellow Europeans including Faldo, the fading superstar whose merits as a potential captain's pick for the Ryder Cup had been much debated in the UK. James revealed in his book that just before the Ryder Cup began he had thrown a letter of encouragement from Faldo into the bin rather than share it with team. The controversy that this revelation aroused led to James resigning as one of Europe's Ryder Cup vice-captains for 2001.

A follow-up book, called After the Bear Pit, covering James'  cancer and his experiences as a European Tour player, as well as further thoughts on the Ryder Cup, appeared in 2002.

Senior Tour and other commitments
James qualified to play senior golf when he turned fifty in late 2003. He chose to play mainly in the U.S. and was second in the Champions Tour Qualifying Tournament Finals that November. In 2004 he became the first European player to win one of the Champions Tour's senior majors with victory at the Ford Senior Players Championship. In 2005, he won on the Champions Tour for a second time at the ACE Group Classic and finished in the top 20 on the money list for a second consecutive season. His last full season on the Champions Tour was 2010 and he has played mainly on the European Senior Tour since then.

James has also worked as a golf commentator for the BBC.

Professional wins (32)

European Tour wins (18)

European Tour playoff record (5–4)

Sunshine Tour wins (1)

Safari Circuit wins (1)

Other wins (5)
1980 Euro Masters Invitational (Italy – not a European Tour event)
1981 Heublein Open (Brazil)
1982 Hennessy Cognac Cup Individual
1983 Euro Masters Invitational (Italy – not a European Tour event)
2011 Gary Player Invitational (with George Coetzee)

Champions Tour wins (3)

European Senior Tour wins (2)

European Senior Tour playoff record (2–0)

Other senior wins (2)
2011 Liberty Mutual Legends of Golf - Raphael Division (with Des Smyth)
2012 Liberty Mutual Legends of Golf - Raphael Division (with Des Smyth)

Results in major championships

CUT = missed the half-way cut (3rd round cut in 1974, 1977 and 1978 Open Championships)
"T" indicates a tie for a place

Summary

Most consecutive cuts made – 7 (1980 Open Championship – 1986 Open Championship)
Longest streak of top-10s – 1 (five times)

Results in World Golf Championships

"T" = Tied

Senior major championships

Wins (1)

Results timeline
''Results not in chronological order before 2021.

CUT = missed the halfway cut
"T" indicates a tie for a place
NT = No tournament due to COVID-19 pandemic

Team appearances
Amateur
Walker Cup (representing Great Britain & Ireland): 1975
European Amateur Team Championship (representing England): 1975

Professional
Hennessy Cognac Cup (representing Great Britain and Ireland): 1976 (winners), 1978 (winners), 1980 (winners), 1982 (winners & individual winner), (representing England) 1984 (winners)
Ryder Cup (representing Great Britain and Ireland/Europe): 1977, 1979, 1981, 1989 (tied and retained cup), 1991, 1993, 1995 (winners), 1999 (non-playing captain)
World Cup (representing England): 1978, 1979, 1982, 1984, 1987, 1988, 1990, 1993, 1997, 1999
Alfred Dunhill Cup (representing England): 1988, 1989, 1990, 1993, 1995, 1997, 1999
Four Tours World Championship (representing Europe): 1988, 1989, 1990

See also
List of golfers with most European Tour wins

References

External links

English male golfers
European Tour golfers
PGA Tour Champions golfers
European Senior Tour golfers
Ryder Cup competitors for Europe
Winners of senior major golf championships
Golf writers and broadcasters
People educated at Stamford School
Sportspeople from Manchester
Sportspeople from Yorkshire
People from Ilkley
1953 births
Living people